Flint was a punk rock band created by Keith Flint of The Prodigy. The band consisted of Keith Flint (lead vocals), Jim Davies (guitar, formerly of Pitchshifter), Kieron Pepper (live drums), Rob Holliday (bass guitar), and Tony Howlett (drums).

The band performed several gigs, their first being a brief set at the inaugural Download Festival 2003 (1 June).  The first release "Asteroids" was released on 19 May 2003 and was a pink, limited edition 10" single available on vinyl.  The second single titled "Aim 4" was released on 14 July 2003.  The video for the second single was directed by Jonas Åkerlund, who also directed The Prodigy's "Smack My Bitch Up" video.  Following the release of "Aim 4" the band planned to release their debut album Device #1 on 28 July 2003; however, this release was cancelled. Shortly after its cancellation, the band decided to split up.  Keith then went on to form a project titled Clever Brains Fryin' while Davies went on to form Victory Pill.

Flint remixed Marilyn Manson's mOBSCENE, with Keith providing new vocals.  The following text, dated 21 April 2003, was found from the official Marilyn Manson pages: "Pay attention! In London, we vandalized a Versace billboard with two gigantic Marilyn Mice and had an amazing crowd sing along to the three piano numbers. Keith Flint (The Prodigy) presented me with his new band's remix of Mobscene on which he sings. We discussed illegal behavior, participated in illegal behavior and became the best of friends over a bottle of Absinthe."

Discography

Albums
Device #1 (2003) – Aborted
The album was originally planned to contain 13 punk rock genre tracks, but plans for that were cancelled. On 28 July, a Device #1 Promo disc was released in limited edition around the UK. Contained 11 tracks:
Asteroids (03:09)
Piggy (03:09)
Laughs (03:30)
Aim 4 (02:58)
Kamikaze (04:26)
Prescription (03:30)
Ju Ju (03:32)
Femme Fatale (03:11)
Vacation (03:28)
Razor (03:49)
NNNN (No Name No Number) (04:16) – hidden track

The full disc's content would go like this, plus two other tracks "Hell, Yeah" and "Inflow".

The promo album was distributed by Polydor.

The last Track on the aborted album titled 'NNNN (No Name No Number) was later revisited and remixed by Flint's The Prodigy band mate Liam Howlett into a Prodigy track called Baby's Got a Temper released in 2002.

Singles
"Asteroids" – single sided pink vinyl limited to 2000 copies
The disc released on 19 May 2003 and only contained "Asteroids" (03:09).
"Aim 4"
Released with the Device #1 Promo, on 28 July 2003.
"Aim 4" (02:58)
"Danny" (02:40)
"Asteroids" (03:09)
"Aim 4" (Video)

The song "Aim 4" has been used as the title music for the German version of the anime Hellsing, and the song "Laughs" has been used as its credit music.

References

The Prodigy
English punk rock groups
Musical groups established in 2003
Musical groups disestablished in 2003
2003 establishments in England
2003 disestablishments in England